Froha is a town and commune in Mascara Province, Algeria. According to the 1998 census it has a population of 11,969.

References 

Communes of Mascara Province